Bonar Law Memorial School (BLMS) provides service to grade 9–12 students in Rexton, New Brunswick. BLMS serves approximately 400 students from Rexton and the surrounding communities. The cultural make-up of the school is varied and includes representation from the local English and Acadian populations. By far the single largest population, however, is First Nation, with representation from Elsipogtog, Indian Island and Bouctouche Federal Reserves. The indigenous students comprise approximately 52% of the total population.

BLMS receives students from two feeder schools: Eleanor W. Graham Middle School and Elsipogtog School. Given the regional nature of BLMS, the vast majority of students are bused to school.

BLMS has a teaching staff of 34 teachers (this number includes two Guidance Counselor and two Methods and Resource teachers) and twenty educational assistants who meets the needs of the student population.

History
The school in named in honour of British Prime Minister Bonar Law, who was born in Rexton.

See also
 Anglophone North School District
 List of schools in New Brunswick

References

External links
 Bonar Law Official Website

Education in Kent County, New Brunswick
High schools in New Brunswick
Bonar Law